Roy Clifton Fredericks (11 November 1942 – 5 September 2000) was a West Indian cricketer who played Test cricket from 1968 to 1977.

He was an opening batsman for the West Indies in both Test cricket and one day cricket, and made 4334 Test runs in a career spanning only nine years. ODIs were infrequent in Fredericks' time, and consequently he only appeared in 12 matches, making 311 runs.

At the first-class level, he represented Glamorgan Cricket Club in English domestic cricket and British Guiana and Guyana. He had a number of opening partners in the Test team before establishing a successful partnership with Gordon Greenidge in the mid-1970s. He was an aggressive batsman who liked to counterattack fast bowlers, but also was capable as a traditional accumulator of runs.

His highest Test score was 169 against Australia at Perth in 1975–76. After Australia had been dismissed early on the second day, in 90 minutes batting before lunch the West Indies scored 130 for 1 off 14 eight-ball overs, and after lunch Fredericks reached his century off only 71 balls, at the time the quickest ever. The West Indies won the match by an innings.

In the inaugural ICC Cricket World Cup held in 1975, Fredericks became the first player in ODI history to be dismissed for being hit wicket and also became the first player to be dismissed for being hit wicket in World Cup history.

Fredericks was nicknamed Freddo by those who knew him. He was an all-round sportsman and represented his country, Guyana, also in table tennis and squash.

Fredericks was a Wisden Cricketer of the Year in 1974.

He was appointed Minister for Youth, Sport and Culture in Guyana in the Forbes Burnham regime.

Death
In 1998, Fredericks underwent an operation for throat cancer. He returned to run cricket programmes for Guyana's Ministry of Youth, Sport and Culture, but had to go back to hospital.

References
Notes

External links

1942 births
2000 deaths
Glamorgan cricketers
Guyanese cricketers
Demerara cricketers
Guyana cricketers
West Indies One Day International cricketers
West Indies Test cricketers
International Cavaliers cricketers
Wisden Cricketers of the Year
World Series Cricket players
Cricketers at the 1975 Cricket World Cup
Afro-Guyanese people
People from Mahaica-Berbice
Guyanese politicians
Guyanese sportsperson-politicians